Edmund Karp (31 December 1913 – 27 August 2000) was an Estonian footballer (goal keeper).

He was born in Tallinn.

He began his football career in 1933 at the club Tallinna Puhkekodu. Later he played also at the clubs Esta, Sport, and Tallinna JK Dünamo.

1936–1940 he was a member of Estonia men's national football team.

References

1913 births
2000 deaths
Estonian footballers
Footballers from Tallinn
JK Dünamo Tallinn players